Denis Leonard Ormerod CBE (17 February 1922 – 11 February 2005) was a career soldier in the British Army.

He was appointed brigadier Ulster Defence Regiment in July 1971. He was the first Roman Catholic commander of the regiment which was drawn mainly from the Protestant community of Northern Ireland.

Early life and military career
Ormerod was educated at Downside School in Somerset.  He joined the army in 1940 and was commissioned into the British Indian Army, following which he served in Malaya, India, Italy, and Greece with the Gurkhas, eventually reaching the rank of major. He also served in Malaya and Palestine during internal security operations in the post war period.

Ulster Defence Regiment
Whether or not it was a conscious decision on the part of the British Ministry of Defence was not known but he acknowledged that his religion helped him establish a rapport with the hierarchy of the Roman Catholic Church in Northern Ireland.

Bibliography
Potter, John. A Testimony to Courage – the Regimental History of the Ulster Defence Regiment 1969 – 1992, Pen & Sword Books Ltd, 2001. .
Ryder, Chris. The Ulster Defence Regiment: An Instrument of Peace?, p. 43. 1991

References

1922 births
2005 deaths
Graduates of the Royal Military College, Sandhurst
Commanders of the Order of the British Empire
Ulster Defence Regiment officers
Royal Irish Fusiliers officers
People educated at Downside School
British Army personnel of the Malayan Emergency
Royal Gurkha Rifles officers
People from High Halden
British people in colonial India
Indian Army personnel of World War II
British Army brigadiers